Dibromodiethyl sulfone is a sulfone containing two 2-bromo-ethyl substituents.

Production
Dibromodiethyl sulfone is produced from dibromodiethyl sulfide by oxidation by chromic acid.

References

Organobromides
Sulfones